Heinemannia laspeyrella is a species of moth of the family Elachistidae. It is found in northern, central and eastern Europe. In the east, the range extends up the Ural and in the south to Siberia.

The wingspan is 17–21 mm. Adults are on wing from mid-May to the beginning of July in one generation per year.

The larvae feed on Lathyrus pisiformis, Orobus vernus and Trifolium species.
They feed on the seeds from within the sees cases. Up to six larvae can be found in a single case. Larvae can be found from July to the first half of August. Full-grown larvae overwinter in the soil beneath a nearby tree.

References

External links
Lepiforum e. V.

Moths described in 1796
Elachistidae
Moths of Europe
Moths of Asia